Herbert H 'Herbie' Hall (16 March 1926 – 26 February 2013) was a British wrestler.

Career
He competed at the 1952 Summer Olympics and the 1956 Summer Olympics.

He represented England and won a silver medal in the -62kg division at the 1954 British Empire and Commonwealth Games in Vancouver, Canada. He also represented England in the -68Kg division at the 1958 British Empire and Commonwealth Games in Cardiff, Wales.

References

1926 births
2013 deaths
British male sport wrestlers
Olympic wrestlers of Great Britain
Wrestlers at the 1952 Summer Olympics
Wrestlers at the 1956 Summer Olympics
Place of birth missing
Wrestlers at the 1954 British Empire and Commonwealth Games
Wrestlers at the 1958 British Empire and Commonwealth Games
Commonwealth Games medallists in wrestling
Commonwealth Games silver medallists for England
Medallists at the 1954 British Empire and Commonwealth Games